Paul Călinescu (23 August 1902 – 25 March 2000) was a Romanian film director and screenwriter. He directed 14 films between 1934 and 1964.

Selected filmography
 Floarea reginei (1946)
 Titanic Waltz (1964)

References

External links

1902 births
2000 deaths
Romanian film directors
Romanian screenwriters
20th-century screenwriters